The Hinatua River is a small river in the Westland District of New Zealand's South Island.  Its headwaters are on Mount Hercules, near  as it runs between Harihari and Te Taho.  The Hinatua River then flows in a general northerly direction, passing just to the east of the Saltwater Lagoon before flowing close to the Tasman Sea coastline before joining the Poerua River at its rivermouth.

References

Westland District
Rivers of the West Coast, New Zealand
Rivers of New Zealand